Dipu Moni (born 8 December 1965) is a Bangladeshi politician, and has been the Minister of Education of Bangladesh since January 2019 and a Member of Parliament representing the Chandpur-3 constituency. She was Foreign Minister of Bangladesh from 2009 to 2013. She was appointed the first female Foreign Minister on 6 January 2009 after victory for the Awami League-led Grand Alliance on 29 December 2008.Currently she is Joint secretary of Bangladesh Awami League

Early life
Moni is a daughter of MA Wadud who was a founding member of the Bangladesh Awami League and known especially for his role in the Language Movement and as the first Council-elected General Secretary of the East Pakistan Chhatra League. Moni passed HSC from Holy Cross College, Dhaka.

Moni studied MBBS at Dhaka Medical College and Hospital and LLB at Bangladesh National University. She later earned Master of Public Health at Johns Hopkins University School of Public Health, and earned Master of Laws at the University of London as an external student. She had completed a course on Negotiations and Conflict Resolutions from Harvard University. She is a lawyer of Bangladesh Supreme Court.

Political career

Moni was the Secretary for Women's Affairs and a Member of the Sub‐Committee on Foreign Affairs of the Bangladesh Awami League before her induction to the cabinet.
She represented Chandpur‐3 as a Member of Bangladesh Parliament. She worked for women's rights and entitlements, health legislation, health policy and management, health financing, strategic planning, and health and human rights under the Constitution and law in Bangladesh's economic and social development programmes and foreign policy issues of the region and globally. As a Minister of Foreign Affairs she has represented her government's position to the Cabinet Ministers and public representatives of Asia, Europe and the US, Ambassadors and Senior Representatives of International Institutions.  As the foreign minister she sought an apology for the 1971 Bangladesh Genocide from Pakistan. She also tried to bring the absconding killers of president Sheikh Mujib. She is the present Awami League Joint General Secretary. She was elected chairman of Asian University for Women in 2016. She is the chairperson of the parliamentary committee on foreign affairs.

Criticisms
As the minister of foreign affairs, Moni was widely criticized by different news media because of her frequent overseas visits. According to some news reports, she made 187 foreign trips and 600 days of overseas stay in four and a half years. In response, Moni said she went abroad every time with the consent of the prime minister, who gave her approval after studying the pros and cons of every visit. She made 114 foreign tours, including 36 with the president and the prime minister and claimed that the number of her bilateral visits was 62, not 17 as reported.

Personal life 
Moni is married to Tawfique Nawaz, an Oxbridge educated senior advocate of the Bangladesh Supreme court.

References

1965 births
Living people
People from Chandpur District
Holy Cross College, Dhaka alumni
Alumni of University of London Worldwide
National University, Bangladesh alumni
Dhaka Medical College alumni
Johns Hopkins University alumni
Alumni of the University of London
Awami League politicians
Women members of the Jatiya Sangsad
Women government ministers of Bangladesh
Foreign ministers of Bangladesh
Female foreign ministers
10th Jatiya Sangsad members
Bangladeshi women diplomats
11th Jatiya Sangsad members
Education ministers of Bangladesh
Sheikh Mujibur Rahman family
Bangladeshi physicians
Bangladeshi women lawyers
20th-century Bangladeshi lawyers
21st-century Bangladeshi women politicians